OKF may refer to:

OKF, the IATA code for Okaukuejo Airport, Namibia
Open Knowledge Foundation, a global, non-profit network that promotes and shares information at no charge